Kangkar Tebrau is a village in Tebrau, Johor Bahru, Johor, Malaysia. This village is located about 10 km from Johor Bahru.

Johor Bahru
Villages in Johor